Etles or Etles silk is a type of silk ikat fabric traditionally made by the Uyghur, Uzbek and Tajik peoples. Traditionally used for men's and women's clothing, in the modern day, Etles's unique patterns are no longer limited to application in clothing, and Etles is also used for soft furnishings and accessories.

Etles is made from the silk produced by the Atlas moth. One of the largest production sites is the city of Hotan and its surrounding towns in the Uyghur homeland.

References

Silk
Uyghur culture
Saturniidae